Zi Prefecture may refer to:

Zi Prefecture (Sichuan) (資州), a prefecture between the 6th and 20th centuries in modern Sichuan, China
Zi Prefecture (Shandong) (淄州), a prefecture between the 6th and 13th centuries in modern Shandong, China

See also
Zizhou (disambiguation)
Zi (disambiguation)